In enzymology, an aminolevulinate transaminase is an enzyme that catalyzes the chemical reaction

5-aminolevulinate + pyruvate  4,5-dioxopentanoate + L-alanine

Thus, the two substrates of this enzyme are 5-aminolevulinate and pyruvate, whereas its two products are 4,5-dioxopentanoate and L-alanine.

This enzyme belongs to the family of transferases, specifically the transaminases, which transfer nitrogenous groups.  The systematic name of this enzyme class is 5-aminolevulinate:pyruvate aminotransferase. Other names in common use include .  This enzyme participates in porphyrin and chlorophyll metabolism.  It employs one cofactor, pyridoxal phosphate.

References

 
 

EC 2.6.1
Pyridoxal phosphate enzymes
Enzymes of unknown structure